Megapenthes is a genus of click beetles in the family Elateridae. There are at least 30 described species in Megapenthes.

Species
These 31 species belong to the genus Megapenthes:

 Megapenthes almeidai Navajas, 1946 g
 Megapenthes angularis (LeConte, 1866) b
 Megapenthes apacheorum Becker, 1971 g
 Megapenthes aterrimus (Motschulsky, 1859) g
 Megapenthes caprella (LeConte, 1859) g b
 Megapenthes confusus Fleutiaux, 1932 g
 Megapenthes elegans Horn, 1871 b
 Megapenthes gentneri Lane, 1965 g
 Megapenthes gomyi Girard, 2001 g
 Megapenthes ibitiensis Navajas, 1944 g
 Megapenthes insignis (LeConte, 1884) b
 Megapenthes lepidus LeConte, 1884 b
 Megapenthes limbalis (Herbst, 1806) b
 Megapenthes longicornis Schaeffer, 1916 b
 Megapenthes lugens (W.Redtenbacher, 1842) g
 Megapenthes nigriceps Schaeffer, 1916 b
 Megapenthes nigriventris LeConte, 1884 g b
 Megapenthes oblongicollis (Miwa, 1929) g
 Megapenthes pallidulus Cate, Platia & Schimmel, 2002 g
 Megapenthes quadrimaculatus (Horn, 1871) b
 Megapenthes rogersi Horn, 1871 g b
 Megapenthes rousseli Fleutiaux, 1933 g
 Megapenthes rufilabris (Germar, 1844) b
 Megapenthes rutilipennis Candeze, 1859 g
 Megapenthes solitarius Fall, 1934 g
 Megapenthes stigmosus (LeConte, 1853) g b
 Megapenthes sturmii (Germar, 1844) g
 Megapenthes tarsalis Schaeffer, 1916 b
 Megapenthes tartareus (LeConte, 1859) g b
 Megapenthes texanus Becker, 1971 g
 Megapenthes turbulentus (LeConte, 1853) b

Data sources: i = ITIS, c = Catalogue of Life, g = GBIF, b = Bugguide.net

References

Further reading

External links

 

Elaterinae